Travis Couture-Lovelady (September 25, 1983) (from Hays, Kansas) was a two-term member of the Kansas House of Representatives, representing House District 110. He was given evaluations of 87%, 89% and 91% by the American Conservative Union. Couture-Lovelady gave up his House seat before the 2016 legislative session to become a full-time state liaison and lobbyist for the National Rifle Association.

References

External links
http://ballotpedia.org/Travis_Couture-Lovelady
https://votesmart.org/candidate/140854/travis-couture-lovelady#.VPCkmiw5CUk

Living people
Republican Party members of the Kansas House of Representatives
People from Hays, Kansas
1983 births
Fort Hays State University alumni
21st-century American politicians